The Palermo Stone is one of seven surviving fragments of a stele known as the Royal Annals of the Old Kingdom of Ancient Egypt. The stele contained a list of the kings of Egypt from the First Dynasty (c.3150–2890 BCE) through to the early part of the Fifth Dynasty (c.2392–2283 BCE) and noted significant events in each year of their reigns. It was probably made during the Fifth Dynasty. The Palermo Stone is held in the Regional Archeological Museum Antonio Salinas in the city of Palermo, Italy, from which it derives its name.

The term "Palermo Stone" is sometimes applied to all seven surviving fragments of the Royal Annals, including those held in museums in Cairo and London.  The fragments are also sometimes described collectively as the "Cairo Annals Stone", although the term "Cairo Stone" is also used to mean only those fragments of the Royal Annals now in Cairo.

The Palermo Stone and other fragments of the Royal Annals preserve what is probably the oldest historical text that has survived from Ancient Egypt and form a key source for Egyptian history in the Old Kingdom.

Description 
The Royal Annals stele, of which the Palermo Stone formed part, may  originally have been about 60 cm high and 2.1m wide.  The fragments are composed of a compact hard black stone, probably a form of basalt.

The Palermo Stone itself is an irregular shield-shaped fragment, 43.5 cm high, 25 cm wide and 6.5 cm thick (maximum dimensions).

The inscription on the "front" (recto) of the Palermo Stone consists of six horizontal bands or registers of hieroglyphic text running right to left. The first register lists the names of predynastic kings of Lower Egypt (identified as such by the wearing of the Red Crown). The second and subsequent registers contain portions of royal annals for pharaohs of the First to Fourth Dynasties, that is lists of the key events in each year of the reign of each king, arranged chronologically. The second register on the Palermo Stone begins with the final year entries for a king of the First Dynasty whose name is not preserved, but who is generally assumed to be either Narmer or Aha. The rest of the second register is taken up with the first nine annual entries for this king's successor, who is again not named on the fragment, but is assumed to be either Aha or his successor Djer. The remainder of the inscription on this side continues with royal annals down to the kings of the Fourth Dynasty.

The text continues on the "back" (verso) of the Palermo Stone, cataloguing events during the reigns of pharaohs down to Neferirkare Kakai, third ruler of the Fifth Dynasty. From the surviving fragments it is unclear whether the Royal Annals originally continued beyond this point in time. Where a king is named, the name of his mother is also recorded, such as Betrest mother of the First Dynasty king Semerkhet and Meresankh I mother of the Fourth Dynasty king Seneferu.

Information recorded in the Royal Annals (as preserved on the Palermo Stone) includes measurements of the height of the annual Nile flood (see Nilometer), the inundation, details of festivals (such as Sed festivals), taxation, sculpture, buildings, and warfare.

Archaeological history 

The original location of the stele is unknown and none of the surviving fragments have a secure archeological provenance. One fragment now in Cairo is said to have been found at an archaeological site at Memphis, while three other fragments now in Cairo were said to have been found in Middle Egypt. No find site for the Palermo Stone itself has been suggested.

The Palermo Stone was purchased by a Sicilian lawyer, Ferdinand Guidano, in 1859 and it has been in Palermo since 1866.  On 19 October 1877, it was presented to the Palermo Archaeological Museum by the Guidano family, where it has remained since.

There are five fragments of the Royal Annals in the Egyptian Museum in Cairo, four of which were acquired between 1895 and 1914. The fifth was purchased on the antiquities market in 1963.  One small fragment is in the Petrie Museum of University College London, forming part of the collection of the archeologist Sir Flinders Petrie (and purchased by him in 1914).

The importance of the Palermo Stone was not recognized until it was noticed by a visiting French archaeologist in 1895. The first full publication and translation was that done in 1902 by Heinrich Schäfer.

Uncertainties 
There are uncertainties regarding the date of the Palermo Stone and of the Royal Annals it records.  It is unknown whether the inscription was done in one go or was added to over time. It is also unknown whether it dates from the period it describes (i.e. from no later than the Fifth Dynasty). It has been suggested that the stele was made much later, perhaps in the Twenty-fifth Dynasty (747–656 BCE).  It seems clear from the content of the inscription that, even if the Royal Annals, as preserved by the Palermo Stone and other fragments, were not carved at or soon after the period they describe, they are directly based on an Old Kingdom original. 

It is also unknown whether all the surviving fragments are part of the same stele or come from different copies.  It is possible that at least one of the smaller fragments held in Cairo (none of which have any clear provenance) is not genuine.

The text is difficult to decipher due both to the state of preservation of the inscription (which varies widely) and due to its antiquity.  If the text is a later copy, rather than a Fifth Dynasty original, there is also the possibility that errors and invention crept in during the copying process.

Significance 
The Palermo Stone and the other associated fragments of the Royal Annals are a vital source for the history of the Old Kingdom and, for example, preserve names of members of the royal families during the first five dynasties, which are not otherwise recorded.

New Kingdom Egyptian king lists, such as the Turin Canon (13th century BCE) and the Abydos king list (reign of Seti I, 1294–1279 BCE), identify Menes (probably Narmer) (c. 3100 or 3000 BCE) as the first king of the First Dynasty and so credit him with unifying Egypt. However, the top register of the Royal Annals names some predynastic rulers of Upper and Lower Egypt, presumably referring to a time before Egypt was unified. Identification of these kings with historical persons remains controversial.

The ancient historian Manetho may have used information similar to the complete Royal Annals stele to construct his chronology of the early dynasties of Egypt, forming part of his Aegyptiaca (History of Egypt), written during the third century BCE, although the surviving king list most closely related to his work (as preserved by later ancient and later writers) is the Turin Canon.<ref>Tetley, C. (2014) [http://www.egyptchronology.com/vols-1--2.html The Reconstructed Chronology of the Egyptian Kings] , Vol I & II, Whangarei, New Zealand. </ref>

 See also 
 Saqqara Tablet
 List of pharaohs

 References 

 Sources 
 Partial and dated English translation of the text in J.H. Breasted, (1906). Ancient Records of Egypt, vol. I, sections 76–167. Chicago: University of Chicago Press.
 St. John, Michael (1999). The Palermo Stone: An Arithmetical View. London: University Bookshop Publications.
 Wilkinson, Toby A. H. (2000). Royal Annals of Ancient Egypt. New York: Columbia University Press. .
 Wilkinson, Toby A. H. (1999). Early Dynastic Egypt. London: Routledge. .
 O'Mara, P.F. (1979). The Palermo Stone and the Archaic Kings of Egypt''. Calif: Paulette Pub. Co, 113-131.

External links 

 Extract of a lecture given by T.A.H. Wilkinson, University College London 2000
 Image of London fragment and translation, Petrie Museum
 Gallery of images of Palermo Stone and Cairo fragments (and more) by J.D. Degreef.
 Christine Tetley's book.

25th-century BC steles
24th-century BC steles
1859 archaeological discoveries
Ancient Egyptian King lists
Ancient Egyptian stelas
Fifth Dynasty of Egypt
Egyptian Museum